The 1967 Fireball 300 was a NASCAR Grand National Series event that was held on March 5, 1967, at Asheville-Weaverville Speedway  in Weaverville, North Carolina.

The name of the race was named after NASCAR Hall of Fame inductee Fireball Roberts, who died in 1964 following an accident in that year's World 600 in Charlotte, North Carolina.

Race report
This was the historic site of Richard Petty's 50th career win in front of 9,500 people in what is now known as the Cup Series. It took one hour and forty-seven minutes for the race to reach its conclusion; Petty defeating Darel Dieringer by outlapping him twice. All twenty-two racers were from the United States of America.

Total winnings for this race were $7,150 ($ when adjusted for inflation). Individual earnings for each driver ranged from the winner's share of $1,800 ($ when adjusted for inflation) to the last-place finisher's portion of $100 ($ when adjusted for inflation).

Jim Conway would retire from NASCAR Cup Series competition after this event. The transition to purpose-built racecars began in the early 1960s and occurred gradually over that decade.  Changes made to the sport by the late 1960s brought an end to the "strictly stock" vehicles of the 1950s.

Qualifying

Finishing order
Section reference: 

* Driver failed to finish race

Timeline
Section reference: 
 Start of race: Darel Dieringer officially began the race with the pole position.
 Lap 41: Jim Paschal's race would be ruined by his vehicle's faulty wiring.
 Lap 51: Engine issues forced Buck Baker out of the race.
 Lap 88: James Hylton's vehicle had a nasty engine problem.
 Lap 93: Problematic lug nuts would drive Earl Brooks out of the event.
 Lap 100: Neil Castles blamed his terrible performance on some nasty clutch issues.
 Lap 104: Richard Petty took over the lead from Darel Dieringer.
 Lap 109: The problems with Roy Mayne's differential knocked him out of the race.
 Lap 116: Darel Dieringer took over the lead from Richard Petty.
 Lap 119: Bobby Allison took over the lead from Darel Dieringer.
 Lap 128: The problems with Roy Tyner's differential knocked him out of the race.
 Lap 144: Richard Petty took over the lead from Bobby Allison.
 Lap 157: The problems with Wayne Smith's differential knocked him out of the race.
 Lap 215: Darel Dieringer took over the lead from Richard Petty.
 Lap 234: Richard Petty took over the lead from Darel Dieringer.
 Finish: Richard Petty was the official winner of the event.

References

Fireball 300
Fireball 300
NASCAR races at Asheville-Weaverville Speedway